The 1977 UCI Juniors Track World Championships were the third annual Junior World Championship for track cycling held in Vienna, Austria in August 1977.

The Championships had five events for men only. The Sprint, Points race, Individual pursuit and Team pursuit were carried forward from the previous edition, while the 1 kilometre time trial was held for the first time.

Events

Medal table

References

UCI Juniors Track World Championships
1977 in track cycling
Track cycling
International cycle races hosted by Austria